Dirol is a commune in the Nièvre department in central France.

Demographics
The January 2019 estimated population was 112 people, down from the 1999 census population of 143.

See also
Communes of the Nièvre department

References

Communes of Nièvre